Onchidella nigricans is a species of small, air-breathing sea slug, a shell-less marine pulmonate gastropod mollusc in the family Onchidiidae.

Distribution 
This species occurs in New Zealand, as well as on the coast of south-eastern Australia, where it is common.

Feeding
O. nigricans is a general herbivore feeding on algae. It also consumes zooplankton.

Habitat
This species can be found in the intertidal zone on a variety of habitats.

References

Further reading 
 Miller M & Batt G, Reef and Beach Life of New Zealand, William Collins (New Zealand) Ltd, Auckland, New Zealand 1973

Onchidiidae
Gastropods described in 1832